Hibbertia stelligera is a species of flowering plant in the family Dilleniaceae and is endemic to Queensland. It is a small, multi-stemmed shrub with linear leaves and yellow flowers arranged singly near the ends of branches, with 20 to 32 stamens arranged in bundles around two densely scaly carpels.

Description

Taxonomy
In 2010, Hellmut R. Toelken raised the form to species status as Hibbertia stelligera. The specific epithet (stelligera) means "star-bearing".

Distribution and habitat
This hibbertia grows in woodland with a heathy understorey in northern Queensland.

Conservation status
Hibbertia stelligera is classified as "least concern" under the Queensland Government Nature Conservation Act 1992.

See also
List of Hibbertia species

References

stelligera
Flora of Queensland
Plants described in 1936
Taxa named by Cyril Tenison White